"Ben Bolt" (Roud 2653) is a sentimental ballad with lyrics derived from a poem by Thomas Dunn English. It enjoyed widespread popularity throughout the English-speaking world during the nineteenth century.

History
Thomas Dunn English wrote the poem "Ben Bolt" in 1842 at the specific request of Nathaniel Parker Willis. While he was then an active participant in the New York City literary scene and lived much of his life in New Jersey, English is popularly believed to have written the poem while visiting Tazewell, Virginia on a hunting trip, as claimed by regional folklorists.

The poem was published in the New-York Mirror, appearing in print for the first time on September 2, 1843.

The most popular musical arrangement of "Ben Bolt" was composed by Nelson Kneass in 1848. A widely reported story is that Kneass produced the song as accompaniment to a play about the recent Battle of Buena Vista, borrowing the music from a German melody. However, a search through Ludwig Erk's folk song compilation Deutscher Liederschatz produced no songs with similar melodies, and it is much more likely that the tune was an original composition by Kneass.

Lyrics
The poem, which is five stanzas long, describes nostalgic scenes from the life of the anonymous narrator. The narrator, who addresses each memory to the title character, begins the first stanza by describing the life and death of a woman named Alice. 

Some variation occurs in the beginning of the poem's fourth stanza. In the original manuscript, the stanza begins as follows:

However, when the poem was arranged to music, the lyrics of that section were changed slightly, so that the relevant lines were as follows:

This mild bowdlerization met with some annoyance from the author. Thomas Dunn English, writing to Harper's Bazaar, commented: "I must protest against this change, because the school-masters of between sixty and seventy years since were, to my memory, 'cruel and grim'; they were neither kind nor true. They seemed to think the only way to get learning into a boy's head was by the use of the rod. There may have been exceptions, but I never met them."

Cultural impact

Shortly after being published, "Ben Bolt" vaulted to nationwide popularity, single-handedly establishing Thomas Dunn English's literary reputation and remaining relevant as a classic American song throughout the nineteenth century. It swiftly became the subject of both tribute and parody, with many sets of variant lyrics. "Ben Bolt" circulated widely in unauthorized broadside format and was selected by Rufus Wilmot Griswold for his anthology The Poets and Poetry of America. The ballad was a particular favorite of Abraham Lincoln during his lifetime.

In literature
"Ben Bolt" had its popularity rejuvenated in 1894 when George du Maurier published his novel Trilby, which uses the song as a plot point. The title character Trilby O'Ferrall is portrayed as incapable of skillful singing when she delivers a tone-deaf version of "Ben Bolt" near the novel's beginning. Later, the failure of Svengali's hypnotic powers is revealed when Trilby is once again incapable of singing "Ben Bolt" with any degree of skill. The success of the novel and the subsequent Trilbyana craze promoted interest in the songs of Trilby. In his old age, Thomas Dunn English contributed a manuscript copy of "Ben Bolt" to an 1895 Trilby-themed charity auction for the benefit of the New York Kindergarten Association.

As a widely known song of the nineteenth century, "Ben Bolt" was popularly used as a cultural reference in books set during that era, whether published in the nineteenth century or decades later. It is quoted in the novel Dr. Sevier by George Washington Cable and by Laura Ingalls Wilder in By the Shores of Silver Lake. Leopold Bloom contemplated Ben Bolt along with other stories about long-lost loves in James Joyce's Ulysses.

James Thurber illustrated "Ben Bolt" as part of a poetry illustration series for The New Yorker.

The song is also referenced in the P. G. Wodehouse novel Uncle Fred in the Springtime, when Mr Pott quotes the opening verse to Lord Ickenham.

In film
Norma Talmadge would have the song played in order to get in character for tearful scenes.
In Svengali (1931), Marian Marsh as Trilby O'Ferrall performs the song.
In Gone with the Wind, Vivien Leigh as Scarlett O'Hara briefly sings several lines from "Ben Bolt."
In Girls About Town, Lilyan Tashman as Marie Bailey sings several lines, complaining about having to sing such an "old-fashioned song" to make her much older boyfriend happy.

In music
James Bellak, Ben Bolt's Waltz (1850)
Charles Grobe, [Variations on] "Ben Bolt" (1850)
William Vincent Wallace, Grande fantaisie de concert sur la ballade Americaine "Ben Bolt" (1853)
John Philip Sousa, "Ben Bolt" March (1888)
Charles Ives, Central Park in the Dark (1906)

Popular vocalists have also recorded covers of "Ben Bolt," from Geraldine Farrar and John McCormack to Joe Dolan and Johnny McEvoy.

References

External links
 "Ben Bolt" at Bartleby.com
 "Ben Bolt" (includes MIDI sound file)

1848 songs
1843 poems
1842 poems
Poems about death